Prince Sithiporn Kridakara (April 11, 1883 – June 22, 1971) is known as Thailand's Farmer Prince who was awarded the 1967 Ramon Magsaysay Award for Public service for his efforts in the development of Thai agriculture. While serving as chairman of the International Rice Commission, he was instrumental for the establishment of the International Rice Research Institute in Los Baños, Laguna in the Philippines.

Personal life
Sithiporn was born on April 11, 1883, and studied in England for most of his early years. At 18, while studying mechanical engineering at City and Guild's Technical College, he was summoned back to his home country to help manage the family's lime-burning business.

At 21, he married a woman who soon died but not without bearing a son. His second wife was Mom Sriphromma, daughter of the last hereditary chief of Nan. Despite his royal blood as fourth son of His Royal Highness Krida Bhinihan, the Prince Naretraworit, grandson of King Mongkut, and nephew of King Chulalongkorn, he developed a profound interest in agriculture. This interest came about due to his wife's fragile health which required the fresh air and open spaces of the countryside.

Career and legacy
Sithiporn successfully propagated the Nicholson Yellow Dent variety of corn which he encouraged other farmers to plant for animal feed. Starting 1950 when rice was not favorable to land conditions, corn was planted instead. By the 1980s, corn became one of Thailand's major exports. He was also instrumental in the establishment of an egg producers' association which made Thailand an exporter of eggs.

When the United Nations Food and Agriculture Organization (FAO) established the International Rice Commission in 1949, Sithiporn was elected as chairman. His suggestion for a research center for rice production during one of the meetings with the Rockefeller Foundation resulted in the establishment of the International Rice Research Institute in Los Baños, Laguna in the Philippines.

Honors and awards
Ramon Magsaysay Award, 1967 for Public Service
 Honorary Doctorate in Agriculture, Kasetsart University
 Honorary member of the Siam Society
 1983 Birth Centenary Thai postage stamp
 First Prize for rice at the 1933 World Seed and Grain Exhibition in Regina, Canada

References

External links
Ramon Magsaysay Award Foundation

Sithiporn Kridakara
Sithiporn Kridakara
Ramon Magsaysay Award winners
Sithiporn Kridakara
1883 births
1971 deaths
Sithiporn Kridakara
Sithiporn Kridakara
Sithiporn Kridakara
Sithiporn Kridakara
19th-century Chakri dynasty
20th-century Chakri dynasty